Amer Ćenanović (25 December 1961 – 1 April 2011) was a Bosnian politician and former army commander who was the 2nd Municipal mayor of Ilidža from 2 October 2004 until his death on 1 April 2011.

He was a member of the Party of Democratic Action (SDA).

Death and legacy
Ćenanović died unexpectedly on 1 April 2011 at the age of 49 in Sarajevo, Bosnia and Herzegovina. Following his death, the Eight Elementary School Ilidža, where Ćenanović was at one point its principal, changed its name to the Amer Ćenanović Elementary School on 22 December 2011 to honour him. Two years later, on 3 April 2013, the first ever Amer Ćenanović Annual Race was held in Ilidža.

References

External links
Amer Ćenanović at ba.ekapija.com

1961 births
2011 deaths
People from Ilidža
Bosniaks of Bosnia and Herzegovina
Bosnia and Herzegovina Muslims
Army of the Republic of Bosnia and Herzegovina soldiers
Politicians of the Federation of Bosnia and Herzegovina
Party of Democratic Action politicians
Municipality mayors of Ilidža